The American Gyro AG-4 Crusader is a small twin engine aircraft. The aircraft was designed as the Shelton Flying Wing in 1933 by Thomas Miles Shelton.

Design
The AG-4 was developed using wind tunnel tests. The American Gyro AG-4 Crusader is an aluminum skinned four place low-wing twin engine aircraft with fixed conventional landing gear, twin tail booms with individual rudders, and a teardrop shaped fuselage. The wing uses trailing edge flaps and 25 gallon fuel tanks are mounted in each wing root. Retractable landing gear were also tested on the model.

Operational history
The prototype was painted a copper color with green leather seats. It was tested in 1935 at Denver Colorado. The aircraft was funded from stock issued in the Crusader Aircraft Corporation, a parent of the American Gyro Company. The company folded in 1938 under securities fraud investigations before the Crusader could go into production

Popular culture
Tootsietoy came out with a die-cast metal toy of the plane, No. 719 in its catalogue.  Hubley and Wyandotte also made toys based on the Shelton Flying Wing.

Variants
American Gyro AG-4 Crusader
American Gyro AG-6 Buccaneer
A six place variant design powered by Menasco engines

Specifications (AG-4 Crusader)

References

Bibliography

 Roca, Alexander Crusader: The Story of the Shelton Flying Wing, its Company, and its Creator  Rare Birds Publishing; 1st edition (1989)

External links
 YouTube video of test flight

1930s United States civil utility aircraft
Low-wing aircraft
Twin-boom aircraft
Aircraft first flown in 1935